Georgios Tambouris (born 8 November 1952) is a Greek alpine skier. He competed in two events at the 1972 Winter Olympics.

References

1952 births
Living people
Greek male alpine skiers
Olympic alpine skiers of Greece
Alpine skiers at the 1972 Winter Olympics
Place of birth missing (living people)